The 1934–35 season was the 37th in the history of the Southern League. The league consisted of Eastern and Western Divisions. Norwich City reserves won the Eastern Division for the third successive season, whilst Yeovil & Petters United won the Western Division. Norwich reserves were declared Southern League champions after winning a championship play-off replay 7–2 after a 2–2 draw in the first match.

Two Southern League clubs applied to join the Football League, but neither was successful.

Eastern Division

A total of 10 teams contest the division, including 9 sides from previous season and one new team.

Newly elected team:
 Aldershot II - returned after one season of absence

Western Division

There were no new clubs in the Western Division this season.

Football League election
Bath City and Folkestone were the only Southern League clubs to apply for election to Division Three South of the Football League. However, both League clubs were re-elected.

References

1934-35
4
1934–35 in Welsh football